Hotel Rodina is a high-rise four-star hotel located in the centre of Sofia, Bulgaria. With height of about 104 metres and 25 stories, it is one of the tallest buildings in the city. It has 500 rooms, 6 luxury apartments and 9 conference rooms.

History 
The hotel was completed in 1979. In 2013 – 2014, several auctions were held for its sale, each time its price falling due to low interest. In the fourth consecutive procedure for the public sale of the hotel, organized by the private bailiff Georgi Dichev due to unpaid debts to UBB, the hotel was bought by Ludmil Stoykov. In 2017 a reconstruction of the hotel began, and in 2022 it reopened as the four-star Astoria Hotel & Casino.

See also
List of tallest buildings in Sofia
List of tallest buildings in Bulgaria

External links 
Official site
Live webcam

References 

Hotels in Sofia
Hotel buildings completed in 1979